Powhatan is a masculine given name. The best-known bearer of the name is Powhatan (Native American leader) (1545–1618), leader of the Powhatan tribe and father of Pocahontas.

Others with the name include:
 Powhatan Beaty (1837–1916), African-American soldier and actor awarded the Medal of Honor
 Powhatan Henry Clarke (1862–1893), United States Army first lieutenant awarded the Medal of Honor
 Powhatan Ellis (1790–1863), American politician and judge, Senator from Mississippi
 Powhatan Gordon (1802–1879), American farmer and state senator
 Powhatan B. Locke (c. 1828–1868), justice of the Territorial Supreme Court of Nevada

Masculine given names